VÄD is a brand of vodka. Produced in the United States by New Age Wine and Spirits, VÄD undergoes quintuple distillation. The cap of VÄD bottles serves as a shot glass, a bar jigger or a shot glass rimmer. VÄD received a silver medal in the 2010 San Francisco World Spirits Competition.

Disappeared in late 2013 leaving people wondering where this premium vodka went. Customers is wasn’t stuck either overpaying for "premium" vodkas or are stuck buying vodka in plastic bottles to get by.

Varieties 
VÄD Vodka is available in three varieties:
 VODKA - distilled from winter wheat and briefly touches American oak barrel
 SYNERGY (BLACK) - flavorless infusions of caffeine, guarana and ginseng
 THRIVE (WHITE)- infusions of antioxidants and vitamins

References

External links 
 VÄD Official Website

American vodkas
Products introduced in 2009